The Batumi Municipal Assembly is a representative body in the city of Batumi, Georgia. Currently consisting of 35 members; of these, 28 are proportional representatives and 7 are elected through single-member districts, representing their constituencies. During the 1990s, the city council did not function as a self-governing body and decisions in the city were made individually by authorities. At this period, the leader of the autonomous republic was Aslan Abashidze, whose authoritarian ruling ended after the Adjara’s Rose Revolution, on May 6, 2004. On October 5, 2006 the first local self-governmental election of the representative body took place. The council is assembled into session regularly, to consider subject matters such as code changes, utilities, taxes, city budget, oversight of city government, and more.  Batumi sakrebulo members are being elected every four years. Currently, the city council has 5 committees. The last election was held in October 2021. The current Chairperson of the Batumi City Assembly is Ramaz Jincharadze.

Composition

The members of the Sakrebulo are selected through a mixed electoral system. Of the 35 seats, 7 are filled through direct elections in local districts of the city. The remaining 28 members are chosen by political parties and are apportioned according to their support citywide. From 2021, city council has 17 members from the ruling Georgian Dream, 14 from the United National Movement, 2 from For Georgia, 1 from Lelo and 1 Independent.

Powers
In accordance with the Code of Local Self-Government of the Organic Law of Georgia, the Sakrebulo exercises its powers to define the administrative-territorial organization of the municipality and its identity, organizational activities, determination of the personnel policy of the municipality, regulation, and control of the activities of executive bodies; In the fields of municipal property management, social, amenities and household utilities, land use and natural resources us municipal territory planning, transport, and road economy, accounting, support for innovative development and informatization.

The authority of the Sakrebulo in the field of administrative-territorial organization of the municipality and defining its identity includes:
 Creation and abolition of administrative units in the municipality, change of their borders
 Establishment of local self-government symbols - coat of arms, flag, and other symbols and make changes in them
 establish the rules for the introduction of honorary titles and awards of the self-governing unit and their award
 names of geographical objects, Establishing the rule of the numbering of buildings in the settlements
 Making a decision on creating, joining, or leaving a non-profit (non-commercial) legal entity together with other self-governing units.
 approval of the socio-economic development strategy of the self-governing unit
 approval of measures and programs to be taken to attract investments and support innovative development in the territory of the municipality

Last election results
The most recent city council election was held on 2 October 2021, and the results were as follows:

! colspan=2| Party
! Lead candidate
! Votes
! %
! +/-
! Seats
! +/-
|-
| bgcolor=#0D00B3| 
| align=left| Georgian Dream
| align=left| Aslan Baladze
| 30,136
| 39.82
|  14.09
| 16
|  3
|-
| bgcolor=#e4012e| 
| align=left| United National Movement 
| align=left| Kakhaber Kashibadze
| 29,065
| 38.40
|  13.48
| 15
|  11
|-
| bgcolor=#702F92| 
| align=left| For Georgia 
| align=left| Nino Batsiashvili
| 7,587
| 10.03
| New
| 3
| New
|-
| bgcolor=#fad406| 
| align=left| Lelo
| align=left| Irakli Kupradze
| 2,491
| 3.29
| New
| 1
| New
|-
| colspan=8 bgcolor=lightgrey| 
|-
| bgcolor=| 
| align=left| Girchi - More Freedom
| align=left| Temur Gorgadze
| 1,193
| 1.57
| New
| 0
| New
|-
| bgcolor=#e7b031| 
| align=left| Alliance of Patriots
| align=left| Zaur Gabaidze
| 917
| 1.21
|  5.52
| 0
|  1
|-
| bgcolor=| 
| align=left| New Political Center - Girchi
| align=left| Levan Bakuridze
| 855
| 1.13
| New
| 0
| New
|-
| bgcolor=#ff0000| 
| align=left| Strategy Aghmashenebeli
| align=left| Beka Diasamidze
| 817
| 1.08
|  0.16
| 0
| 
|-
| bgcolor=#003C7B| 
| align=left| European Georgia
| align=left| Vakhtang Kaloiani
| 748
| 0.98
|  5.79
| 0
|  1
|-
| bgcolor=| 
| align=left| Labour Party
| align=left| Davit Robakidze
| 698
| 0.92
|  2.27
| 0
| 
|-
| bgcolor=red| 
| align=left| Droa
| align=left| Dimitri Darchia
| 407
| 0.53
| New
| 0
| New
|-
| bgcolor=#D3D3D3| 
| align=left| Others
| align=left| 
| 762
| 0.85
| 
| 
| 
|-
! colspan=3| Total
! 75,676
! 100.0
! 
! 35
! 
|-
! colspan=3| Electorate/voter turnout
! 
!  
! 
! 
! 
|-
| colspan=8| Source: 
|}

Previous election results

2017

! colspan=2| Party
! Votes
! %
! Seats
|-
| bgcolor=| 
| align=left| Georgian Dream
| 26,415
| 53.91
| 19
|-
| bgcolor= #e4012e| 
| align=left| United National Movement 
| 12,209
| 24.92
| 4
|-
| bgcolor= #003876| 
| align=left| European Georgia
| 3,319
| 6.77
| 1
|-
| bgcolor= #e7b031| 
| align=left| Alliance of Patriots
| 3,296
| 6.73
| 1
|-
| colspan=5 bgcolor=lightgrey| 
|-
| bgcolor=| 
| align=left| Labour Party
| 1,561
| 3.19
| 0
|-
| bgcolor= #004a99| 
| align=left| Democratic Movement
| 942
| 1.92
| 0
|-
| bgcolor= #ff0000| 
| align=left| Strategy Aghmashenebeli
| 451
| 0.92
| 0
|-
! colspan=1| Total
!
! 50,935
! 100.0
! 25 
|-
| colspan=5| Source: 
|}

2014

2010

2006

See also 
 Local government in Georgia (country)

Explanatory notes

References

Batumi
City assemblies in Georgia (country)